Donald Pizer is an American academic and literary critic. He is the Pierce Butler Professor of English Emeritus at Tulane University, and the author of several books on naturalism. He was awarded a Guggenheim Fellowship in 1962.

For University of Georgia professor James Nagel, Pizer "has made enormous contributions to the study of naturalism in the period from 1890 through World War II, with a score or more of books on Jack London, Hamlin Garland, Theodore Dreiser, Frank Norris, John Dos Passos, the 1890s, and twentieth-century fiction."

Works

References

Living people
University of California, Los Angeles alumni
Tulane University faculty
Year of birth missing (living people)